Wheelchair fencing at the 2018 Asian Para Games was held in Jakarta between 7 and 11 October 2018.

Medal table

Medalists

Men

Women

See also
Fencing at the 2018 Asian Games

References

External links
 Wheelchair Fencing - Asian Para Games 2018
 RESULT SYSTEM - ASIAN PARA GAMES JAKARTA 2018

2018 Asian Para Games events